OJD may refer to:
 OJD France, a French non-profit organisation that certifies the circulation of print media
 OJD Morocco, a Moroccan audit bureau of print media circulation
 Oregon Judicial Department
 Ovine Johne's disease or paratuberculosis